The Municipality of Kiama is a local government area in the Illawarra region of New South Wales, Australia. The area is situated south of Shellharbour and the City of Wollongong and is located adjacent to the Pacific Ocean, the Princes Highway and the South Coast railway line.

Towns and localities 

The Municipality of Kiama contains the following towns and localities:

 Kiama 
 Bombo
 Kiama Downs
 Kiama Heights
 Minnamurra
 Barren Grounds (part)
 Brogers Creek (part)
 Broughton Village (part)
 Budderoo
 Carrington Falls
 Curramore
 Foxground
 Gerringong
 Gerroa
 Jamberoo
 Jerrara
 Knights Hill
 Rose Valley
 Saddleback Mountain
 Toolijooa 
 Upper Kangaroo Valley (part)
 Werri Beach
 Willow Vale

Municipal history 
The municipality of Kiama was created in 1859. There were three wards: Kiama, Gerringong and Jamberoo. The first council comprised James Colley, John Sharpe and Joseph Pike (representing the Kiama Ward); John Hukins, John Colley and John Hanrahan (representing the Jamberoo Ward); and Joseph Blow, Robert Miller and James Robinson (representing the Gerringong Ward). The first mayor of Kiama was James Colley.

In 1871, Gerringong separated from the Kiama municipality and Jamberoo in 1892. In 1954, the Gerringong, Jamberoo and Kiama municipalities were amalgamated forming today's current municipal boundaries.

Kiama has had three female mayors: Ruth Devenney (1991 until 1992), Joyce Wheatley (1992 until 2000) and Sandra McCarthy (2000 until 2012).

The Kiama community along with the Shoalhaven community actively campaigned against any forced council amalgamation between the two councils. Kiama council held a non-compulsory poll on 7 May 2016 to grasp community attitudes to the proposal. The results of the poll concluded that 95% of the community supported remaining an independent council, with a 49.9% turnout. On 12 May 2016, the NSW State Government determined not to amalgamate Kiama and Shoalhaven council areas.

Demographics

At the  the total population of the Municipality was 21,464 people. The median age of the community was 47 years.

Almost 21% of the population was born outside of Australia, predominantly migration from North-West Europe. The Indigenous Australian population is 2% of the total community population.

English was spoken as a first language by 90% of the population. The top response for language other than English spoken was Italian.

Council

Current composition and election method
The council of the municipality of Kiama is composed of nine councillors elected proportionally as a single ward. All councillors are elected for a fixed four-year term of office. The mayor is elected by the councillors at the first meeting of the council. The most recent election was held on 4 December 2021 and the makeup of the council is as follows:

The current Council, elected in 2021, in order of election, is:

See also
 Gainsborough Estate

References

External links
Kiama Municipal Council Website

 
Kiama
1859 establishments in Australia